Basketball was contested for both men and women in the 2017 Summer Deaflympics from July 19-July 29. Yaşar Doğu Sport Hall and Bahattin Ekinci Sports Hall which are located at Samsun, Turkey were the venues selected to host the basketball matches.

Lithuania won the gold medal for the Men's Category by defeating Venezuela with 70–64.

In the women's Category, Greece defeated Lithuania in the final with 67–50.

Men's tournament

Group stage

Group A

Group B

Knockout stage

Elimination 
<onlyinclude>

Classification

Women's tournament

Group stage

Group A

Group B

Knockout stage

Elimination

Classification

Medal summary

Medalists

References

External links 

 basketball
 Results book

2017 Summer Deaflympics
Deaflympics
International basketball competitions hosted by Turkey